William Brabazon, 9th Earl of Meath (6 July 1769 – 26 May 1797), styled Lord Brabazon from 1779 to 1790, was an Anglo-Irish peer.

The second son of Anthony Brabazon, 8th Earl of Meath and Grace Leigh, he became the heir apparent after the death of his elder brother Chaworth in 1779. He sat for Dublin County from 1789 until he succeeded his father in the peerage in 1790.

He was never married. Upon dying in a duel with one Captain Robert Gore on 26 May 1797, he was succeeded by his brother John Brabazon, 10th Earl of Meath.

References

1769 births
1797 deaths
Brabazon, William Brabazon, Lord
Members of the Parliament of Ireland (pre-1801) for County Dublin constituencies
William
9